The 1938 Alabama gubernatorial election took place on November 8, 1938, to elect the governor of Alabama. Democratic incumbent Bibb Graves was term-limited, and could not seek a second consecutive term.

Democratic primary
At the time this election took place, Alabama, as with most other southern states, was solidly Democratic, and the Republican Party had such diminished influence that the Democratic primary was the de facto contest for state offices; after winning the Democratic primary it was a given you would win the general election.

Candidates
 James H. Arnold
 Frank M. Dixon, attorney and candidate for governor in 1934
 R. J. Goode, Commissioner of Agriculture and Industries
 D. Hardy Riddle
 Chauncey Sparks, State Representative

Results

Results

References

1938
gubernatorial
Alabama
November 1938 events